The 2015 ICC Cricket World Cup was the 11th Cricket World Cup, a quadrennial One Day International (ODI) cricket tournament contested by men's national teams and organised by the International Cricket Council (ICC). It was jointly hosted by Australia and New Zealand from 14 February to 29 March 2015, and was won by Australia. This was the second time the tournament was held in Australia and New Zealand, the first having been the 1992 Cricket World Cup.

The tournament consisted of 14 teams, which were split into two pools of seven, with each team playing every other team in their pool once. The top four teams from each pool progressed to the knockout stage, which consisted of quarter-finals, semi-finals and a final.

The final was between the co-hosts Australia and New Zealand. Australia won by seven wickets, to win their fifth Cricket World Cup.

The total attendance was 1,016,420, with an average of 21,175 per game. The final at the Melbourne Cricket Ground had a crowd of 93,013, a record one-day cricket crowd for Australia In India, the largest television rating was for the Australia–India semi-final, 15% of television-viewing households.

Host selection

Bids
The ICC announced the hosts for the previous World Cup, the 2011 competition, on 30 April 2006. Australia and New Zealand had also bid for the tournament and a successful Australasian bid for the 2011 World Cup would have seen a 50–50 split in games, with the final still up for negotiation. The Trans-Tasman bid, Beyond Boundaries, was the only bid for 2011 delivered to the ICC headquarters at Dubai before 1 March deadline. Considerable merits of the bid included the superior venues and infrastructure, and the total support of the Australian and New Zealand governments on tax and custom issues during the tournament, according to Cricket Australia chief executive James Sutherland. The New Zealand government had also assured that the Zimbabwean team would be allowed to take part in the tournament after political discussions about whether their team would be allowed to tour Zimbabwe in 2005.

ICC President Ehsan Mani said that the extra time required by the Asian bloc to hand over its bid had harmed the four-nation bid. However, when it came to the voting, the Asians won by seven votes to four; according to the Pakistan Cricket Board (PCB), it was the vote of the West Indies Cricket Board (WICB) that turned the matter. It was reported in Pakistani newspaper Dawn that the Asian countries promised to hold fundraising events for West Indian cricket during the 2007 Cricket World Cup, which may have influenced the vote. However, I.S. Bindra, chairman of the monitoring committee of the Asian bid, denied that, saying that it was their promise of extra profits of US$400 million that swung the vote their way.

The ICC was so impressed by the efficiency of the Trans-Tasman bid that they decided to award the next World Cup, to be held in 2015, to them.

Australia and New Zealand last jointly hosted the Cricket World Cup in 1992.

Format
The tournament featured 14 teams, the same number as the 2011 World Cup, giving associate and affiliate member nations a chance to participate.

The format was the same as the 2011 edition: 14 teams take part in the initial stages, divided into two groups of seven; the seven teams play each other once before the top four teams from each group qualify for the quarter-finals.

On 29 January 2015, ICC reinstated the use of the Super Over for Cricket World Cup Final match if the match finished as a tie.

Qualification

Per ICC regulations, the 10 ICC full member nations qualify for the tournament automatically. Immediately after the 2011 World Cup, it was decided that the next tournament would be reduced to only feature the 10 full members. This was met with heavy criticism from a number of associate nations, especially from the Ireland cricket team, who had performed well in 2007 and 2011, including victories over Pakistan and England, both full member nations. Following support shown by the ICC Cricket Committee for a qualification process, the ICC reversed their decision in June 2011 and decided that 14 teams would participate in the 2015 World Cup, including four associate or affiliate member nations.

At the ICC Chief Executives' Committee meeting in September 2011, the ICC decided on a new qualifying format. The top two teams of the 2011–13 ICC World Cricket League Championship qualify directly. The remaining six teams join the third and fourth-placed teams of 2011 ICC World Cricket League Division Two and the top two teams of 2013 ICC World Cricket League Division Three in a 10-team World Cup Qualifier to decide the remaining two places.

On 9 July 2013, as a result of a tied match against the Netherlands, Ireland became the first country to qualify for the 2015 World Cup. On 4 October 2013, Afghanistan qualified for their first Cricket World Cup after beating Kenya to finish in second place behind Ireland.

Scotland defeated the United Arab Emirates in the final of the 2014 Cricket World Cup Qualifier and both teams qualified for the last two spots in the 2015 Cricket World Cup.

Preparations

Local organising committee
In preparation for the 2015 Cricket World Cup, the organising committee of the tournament was finalised. John Harnden was named chief executive, James Strong as chairman, and Ralph Waters was named as the deputy chairman.

Allocation of matches
When Australia and New Zealand bid for the 2011 Cricket World Cup in 2006, they said that it will see a 50–50 split in games. Finally, it was decided on 30 July 2013 that Australia would host 26 matches, while New Zealand got a share of 23 matches in the tournament. There was a tense battle between Melbourne and Sydney to host the final. On 30 July 2013, it was announced that Melbourne would host the final, with Sydney and Auckland hosting the semi-finals.

Visas
It was announced that spectators travelling to World Cup matches in New Zealand who would otherwise not be entitled to a visa waiver, would be able to enter New Zealand if they held an Australian visitor visa. This was a special Trans-Tasman Visa Arrangement for the 2015 Cricket World Cup.

Media and promotion

The World Cup has grown as a media event with each tournament. The International Cricket Council has sold the rights for broadcasting of the 2015 Cricket World Cup for US$2 billion to ESPN Star Sports and Star Sports. According to Strong, the Local Organising Committee (LOC) wants to make the tournament the most fan-friendly event of its kind and take cricket to a wide range of communities throughout Australia and New Zealand.

Sachin Tendulkar was named by the ICC as the World Cup Ambassador for the second time, after filling the role at the 2011 Cricket World Cup.

Tickets for India v Pakistan in Adelaide reportedly sold out within 12 minutes of going on sale. The match received an average television audience in India of 14.8% of TV-equipped households. The semi-final, Australia–India, had a higher average rating in India, 15.0%, but no 2015 match surpassed the 2011 Final among Indian viewers. The 2015 World Cup came at a time of declining viewing figures for cricket in India. Broadcaster Star Sports claimed that its coverage reached 635 million viewers in India. An ICC-commissioned report claimed that the tournament was watched by over 1.5billion people.

Broadcasting rights
The following networks broadcast the tournament:

Opening ceremony

The opening ceremonies were held separately in Christchurch, New Zealand and Melbourne, Australia, on 12 February 2015, two days before the first two matches.

Prize money
The International Cricket Council declared a total prize money pool of $10 million for the tournament, which was 20 percent more than the 2011 edition. The prize money was distributed according to the performance of the team as follows:

This means that if the winner had remained undefeated throughout the group stage of the tournament, they would have won a total of $4,245,000 (winner's prize plus $45,000 for each group stage win), while a team eliminated in the group stage without any wins would have gotten $35,000.

Venues
Each venue hosted 3 pool stage matches. The quarter-finals were in Sydney, Melbourne, Adelaide and Wellington, the semi-finals were played in Auckland and Sydney, and the final was played in Melbourne. Altogether there were 49 matches in 14 venues, with Australia hosting 26 games and New Zealand hosting 23 games.

Umpires

The umpire selection panel selected 20 umpires to officiate at the World Cup: five each from Australia and England, five from Asia, two each from New Zealand and South Africa and one from the West Indies.

Australia
  Bruce Oxenford
  Paul Reiffel
  Steve Davis
  Rod Tucker
  Simon Fry

South Africa
  Marais Erasmus
  Johan Cloete

England
  Ian Gould
  Nigel Llong
  Richard Illingworth
  Richard Kettleborough
  Michael Gough

New Zealand
  Billy Bowden
  Chris Gaffaney

India
  S. Ravi

Pakistan
  Aleem Dar

Sri Lanka
  Kumar Dharmasena
  Ranmore Martinesz
  Ruchira Palliyaguruge

West Indies
  Joel Wilson

Squads

The teams, after initially naming a provisional 30-member squad, were required to finalise a 15-member squad for the tournament on or before 7 January 2015.

Warm-up matches
Fourteen non-ODI warm-up matches were played from 8 to 13 February.

Group stage
A total of 42 matches were played throughout the group stage of the tournament. The top four teams from each pool qualified for the quarter-finals.  In the event that two or more teams are tied on points after six matches the team with the most wins was to be ranked higher.  If tied teams also had the same number of wins then they had to be ranked according to net run rate.

Pool A

Pool B

Knockout stage

While the dates and venues were fixed, which match-up they host was subject to change to accommodate the host countries should they qualify. Both hosts qualified for the quarter-finals; Australia played the match on 20 March in Adelaide, and New Zealand played the match on 21 March in Wellington. Since Sri Lanka, the next highest ranked team, progressed to the quarter-finals, they played in Sydney. If England had advanced, as they were the third-highest ranked team, they would have played in Melbourne. As England failed to qualify for the quarter-finals, Bangladesh took their place. The teams from each pool was paired based on the A1 v B4, A2 v B3, A3 v B2, A4 v B1 format.

New Zealand's semi-final against South Africa was played on 24 March in Auckland while Australia's semi-final against India was played on 26 March in Sydney. Both the host nations qualified for the final, where Australia defeated New Zealand by 7 wickets.

Quarter-finals

Semi-finals

Final

Statistics

Most runs

Most wickets

Controversies
 The Pool A match between Australia and England ended when James Anderson was run out straight after James Taylor was given out lbw. Because Taylor's decision was reviewed and overturned, the ICC later admitted that the ball should have been declared dead (according to Article 3.6a of Appendix 6 of the Decision Review System Playing Conditions), and so Anderson was incorrectly given out.
 During the Pool B match between Ireland and Zimbabwe, Sean Williams was caught by Ireland's John Mooney in a close run chase. Mooney was extremely close to the boundary and eight different television replays were inconclusive as to whether his foot had touched the boundary rope. Meanwhile, Williams had walked and the umpires signalled him out.
 During the second quarter-final match between India and Bangladesh, Rubel Hossain bowled a full toss to Rohit Sharma who was caught at square-leg. The umpire thought the ball was too high and declared it a no-ball, meaning the batsman was not out. The ICC's Bangladeshi President, Mustafa Kamal, later questioned the integrity of the umpire and threatened to resign in protest and Bangladesh's Prime Minister Sheikh Hasina said India won the match because of umpiring errors. However, ICC chief executive Dave Richardson claimed the accusations were baseless, and based on personal feelings of an individual. He said the incident was a 50–50 call and the decision belonged to the umpire.

See also

 List of Cricket World Cup centuries

References

External links

Official 2015 World Cup site
Cricket World Cup at icc-cricket.com
2015 Cricket World Cup total attendance released by ICC

 
2014–15 Australian cricket season
2014–15 New Zealand cricket season
2015 in Australian cricket
2015 in New Zealand cricket
2015
International cricket competitions in 2014–15
International cricket competitions in Australia
International cricket competitions in New Zealand
February 2015 sports events in Oceania
March 2015 sports events in Oceania